The Kyrgyz-Ata Botanical Reserve is located in Nookat District of Osh Region of Kyrgyzstan. It was established in 1975 with a purpose of conservation of standard natural area where ixiolirion, colchicum, crocus, and tulip (Tulipa ferganica Vved. and Tulipa turkestanica (Regel)) grow. The botanical reserve occupies 30 hectares.

References

Botanical reserves in Kyrgyzstan
Protected areas established in 1975